Wijeratne Miyuri Samarasinghe (15 March 1939 – 6 February 2021: as ), popularly as Miyuri Samarasinghe, was an actress in Sri Lankan cinema, theater and television. Apart from acting, she also worked as a dancer, scriptwriter, producer and director. She was serving as the President of Sudarshi Institute.

Personal life
She was born on 15 March 1939 in Moratuwa. She first attended Holy Rosary Catholic School, Moratuwa and then went to Musaeus College. At the age of 14, she was able to perform upcountry and low country dances under the guidance of Jayantha Algama. Therefore, she was selected to perform the middle and end dances of the monthly radio show.

She worked for the Sinhala Cultural Institute (Sudarsi) as a teacher, holding various positions.

She married at the age of 17 and by the age of 24, she was a mother of four children. She met her husband Piyal Samarasinghe during school days. The couple has three daughters - Sujeewa, Deepthi, Awanthi - and one son, Ruwan. Deepthi and Awanthi are twins. Her husband Piyal died in 1979, when she was 39 years old.

She died on 6 February 2021 at the age of 81 after a prolonged battle with cancer.

Acting career
While still in school, she entered the Radio Ceylon and later went on to various radio programs with the late musician M. K. Rocksamy. She became a permanent member of the Maasika Reguma program. Meanwhile, she attended to radio drama screen test conducted by Dharma Sri Wickramasinghe and became one of the top five scorers. At that time, she joined other young artists in the radio such as Geetha Kanthi Jayakody and Niranjala Sarojini for programs such as Baloli Loli Loli. Although she moved away from art with her marriage, she later joined Mercy Edirisinghe for Welikala Ratna's stage play Aluth Dawasak.

Then she received many opportunities for acting in stage plays such as Ran Kanda, Umathusan Warusawa, Bammanno, Uruvisi, Hitha Honda Ammandi, Nattukkarayo, Nekatha, Othello, Sivamma Dhanapala, Lora and Nawasiya Anu Nawaya. She has acted in over 300 stage plays and produced and directed 10 plays. In 1981, she won the Award for Best Actress at Presidential Festival for the play Nawasiya Anu Nawaya. At the same year, her production Hima Kurullo received four awards at the Golden Design Awards for Best Actor, Actress, Script and Production. In 1983, she wrote and directed the short drama Loka Dekak Athara, where she won the Best actress award. Then she directed the play ''Parasakwala Peyak. It also won awards for the Best Actress and Best Production. She has appeared in over 300 different stage plays such as: Hita Honda ammaṇḍi, Pārā, Dēśapāluvā, Otelō, Næṭṭukkārayō, and Nækatha.

While she was still active on stage, she made her film debut with the film Baduth Ekka Horu with a minor role. Her first major role in films came through 1973 film Miringuwa directed by Amarasena Kumarasinghe. Since then, she has acted in many films under renowned filmmakers, including Podi Vijay, Adhishtanaya, Ridee Thella, Madol Duwa, Viragaya, Yahalu Yeheli and Adara Hasuna.

She entered television dramas with the New Year teledrama Erabadu Mal directed by Bandula Vithanage. After that she appeared in many motherly roles in over 500 tele serials such as Irata Handana Mal, Ira Paya, Ganga saha Nissanka, Sannaliyane, Nedeyo, Sihina Nimnaya, Sura Asura, Damini, Passe Gena Manamali and Sudo Sudu. She was also awarded the actress who acted in the most teledramas. She won Presidential Awards for Best Performance in 1976 and then Best Actress Award for drama Kemmura in 2002.

A concert Miyuri Samarasinghe Rangabhinandana organized by the Department of Culture and the Tower Hall Theater Foundation to pay tribute to her was held at the Maradana Tower Hall Theater on 4 October 2015. As she passed the 50th anniversary of her drama career, she wrote her life story and published a book titled Kala Lowe Mama Ipadunemi.

She has directed and produced nine stage dramas - Loka Dekak Athara, Parasakwala Peyak, Ammai Puthai, Hima Kurullo, Paara, Anna Karonina, Sapatheru Hamine, Abarthuwak, Miyuri Rangamala - and produced one play Muthu Aete. She was awarded the honorary title of Maanava Hithavadee Keerthi Sri Veeraputra Deshabandu in June, 2019 for the service towards drama in Sri Lanka.

Selected television serials

 Damini
 Doo Daruwo
 Ganga saha Nissanka
 Hiruta Pipena Sooriyakantha
 Ilandariyo 
 Ingammaruwa
 Ira Paya
 Irata Handana Mal
 Malsara Akunu
 Maya Seya 
 Nedeyo
 Paata Sarungal
 Passe Gena Manamali
 Sannaliyane
 Sansara Sakmana 
 Sihina Nimnaya
 Sudo Sudu
 Sura Asura
 Theertha Tharanaya
 Yes Boss

Filmography

References

External links
 Chat With Miyuri Samarasinghe

1939 births
2021 deaths
Sri Lankan film actresses
20th-century Sri Lankan actresses
21st-century Sri Lankan actresses
Sri Lankan television actresses
Sri Lankan stage actresses